Tangata is a genus of Polynesian araneomorph spiders in the family Orsolobidae, and was first described by Raymond Robert Forster & Norman I. Platnick in 1985.

Species
 it contains seventeen species, found only in New Zealand:
Tangata alpina (Forster, 1956) – New Zealand
Tangata furcata Forster & Platnick, 1985 – New Zealand
Tangata horningi Forster & Platnick, 1985 – New Zealand
Tangata kohuka Forster & Platnick, 1985 – New Zealand
Tangata murihiku Forster & Platnick, 1985 – New Zealand
Tangata nigra Forster & Platnick, 1985 (type) – New Zealand
Tangata orepukiensis (Forster, 1956) – New Zealand
Tangata otago Forster & Platnick, 1985 – New Zealand
Tangata parafurcata Forster & Platnick, 1985 – New Zealand
Tangata plena (Forster, 1956) – New Zealand
Tangata pouaka Forster & Platnick, 1985 – New Zealand
Tangata rakiura (Forster, 1956) – New Zealand
Tangata stewartensis (Forster, 1956) – New Zealand
Tangata sylvester Forster & Platnick, 1985 – New Zealand
Tangata tautuku Forster & Platnick, 1985 – New Zealand
Tangata townsendi Forster & Platnick, 1985 – New Zealand
Tangata waipoua Forster & Platnick, 1985 – New Zealand

See also
 List of Orsolobidae species

References

Araneomorphae genera
Endemic fauna of New Zealand
Orsolobidae
Spiders of New Zealand
Taxa named by Raymond Robert Forster
Endemic spiders of New Zealand